Brice is an unincorporated community in Noble Township, Jay County, Indiana.

History
A post office was established at Brice in 1883, and remained in operation until it was discontinued in 1901. Brice was platted in 1886.

Geography

References

Unincorporated communities in Jay County, Indiana
Unincorporated communities in Indiana